This is a list of American Sabreurs. (Only noted and contemporary American sabreurs are included):

Armitage, Norman
Becker, Christine
Green, Charlotte "Sherry"
Jacobson, Emily
Jacobson, Sada
Kovacs, Stephen (1972–2022)
Kwartler, Allan S.
Lee, Ivan
Morehouse, Tim
Muhammad, Ibtihaj
Rogers, Jason
Smart, Keeth
Spencer-El, Akhi
Thompson, Caity
Ward, Rebecca
Westbrook, Peter
Williams, James
Worth, George
Zagunis, Mariel

See also
Sabre
Fencing
List of American epee fencers
List of American foil fencers
USFA
USFA Hall of Fame

Sabre